Apeirogon is a novel by Colum McCann, published in February 2020.

The novel explores the conflict in the Middle East. It follows the story of two men who each lost a daughter. One is Palestinian, the other Israeli.

Plot
The story follows two real life figures: Rami Elhanan, an Israeli graphic designer, and Bassam Aramin, a Palestinian scholar and previous political prisoner. Consisting of 1001 short sections, the two central figures bond over the untimely deaths of their respective daughters.

Reviews
Reviews for the book have been generally positive. Charles Finch in The Washington Post described the book as "a loving, thoughtful, grueling novel. Shoiab Alam, writing in The Daily Star, hailed the novel as "a masterful and timely literary response to [the] region's neverending horrors." However, the international best-selling Palestinian writer Susan Abulhawa calls it "Another colonialist misstep in commercial publishing" that "mystifies the colonisation of Palestine as a ‘complicated conflict’ between two equal sides".

Awards

References 

2020 American novels
Random House books
Novels set during the Israeli–Palestinian conflict